Dzhangi may refer to:
Vardablur, Aragatsotn, Armenia, formerly Dzhangi
Cəngi, Azerbaijan
Dzhangi-Dzhol, Kyrgyzstan